Stefan Feliks Bialas (born 8 December 1948 in Siemianowice Śląskie) is a former Polish football player and manager.

He played for several Polish clubs, including Ruch Chorzów, Legia Warsaw and Śląsk Wrocław. He then moved to France and played for Gueugnon, Besançon, Nœux-les-Mines, Paris FC and Creil.

He later began a coaching career, first as assistant manager of Paris FC, then with Compiègne, Creil, Beauvais, Club Olympique des Transports and Stade Tunisien, and working briefly as a coach for Cracovia in 2006. On 12 May 2006 Bialas was appointed as the manager of Jagiellonia Białystok. On 7 June 2008 he mutually terminated his contract with the club. On 14 March 2010 he was officially named as the head coach of Legia Warsaw, where he was replaced by Maciej Skorża on 1 June 2010.

He has commentated for several Canal + during the Ligue 1 matches.

References

External links 
 Stefan Białas Profile- Cracovia Online Encyclopedia

1948 births
Living people
People from Siemianowice Śląskie
Sportspeople from Silesian Voivodeship
Polish footballers
Ruch Chorzów players
Śląsk Wrocław players
Legia Warsaw players
FC Gueugnon players
Racing Besançon players
US Nœux-les-Mines players
Paris FC players
Ligue 2 players
Polish expatriate footballers
Expatriate footballers in France
Polish expatriate sportspeople in France
Association football midfielders
Polish football managers
AS Beauvais Oise managers
Stade Tunisien managers
MKS Cracovia managers
Jagiellonia Białystok managers
Legia Warsaw managers
Polish expatriate football managers
Expatriate football managers in France
Expatriate football managers in Tunisia
Polish expatriate sportspeople in Tunisia